After Death is an Italian zombie film directed by Claudio Fragasso. The film is set on a remote island where a voodoo curse raises the dead from their graves to feast on the flesh of the living. When a boat of explorers⁠—including a young girl who experienced the zombie uprising years earlier⁠—makes an emergency docking on the island, the crew find that their only hope for survival is a protective idol given to the young girl by her mother years ago.

Plot
Researchers at a remote jungle island outpost discover the natives are practicing voodoo and black magic. After killing the local priest (James Sampson), a voodoo curse begins to raise the dead to feed on the living in retribution. The researchers on the island are killed by the newly risen zombies, except for Jenny (Candice Daly), the daughter of a scientist couple. She escapes, protected by a magical necklace charm given to her by her mother shortly before her death.

She returns years later as an adult with a group of mercenaries (Tommy, Dan, Rod, and Rod's girlfriend Louise) to try to uncover what happened to her parents. Shortly after arriving at the island, their boat's engine dies, stranding them. Meanwhile, elsewhere on the island, a trio of hikers – Chuck, David, and Maddis 'Mad' – discover a cave, the same cave leading to the underground temple where the original curse was created. After accidentally reviving the curse, the dead return to kill any who trespass on their island. The zombies eat David, and Mad is also killed before he can escape the tunnels. The mercenaries encounter their first zombie, who injures Tommy.

Taking shelter in the remains of the old research facilities' medical quarters, they are soon joined by Chuck (Jeff Stryker), the only surviving hiker. Arming themselves with weapons left behind by the long-dead research team, they make their stand as the dead once again rise. Rod is bitten by a zombie and later turns into one and kills Louise. A zombified Louise kills Dan before Chuck reluctantly kills him. Tommy stays behind and blows up the facility with himself and the zombies in it while Jenny and Chuck flee, the only survivors remaining. They stumble upon the cave again, where the zombies appear and attack. Chuck is killed, and Jenny apparently becomes an advanced zombie. The ending is unclear.

Cast
Jeff Stryker as Chuck (credited as Chuck Peyton)
Candice Daly as Jenny
Massimo Vanni as David, Chuck's friend (credited as Alex McBride)
Jim Gaines as Dan
Don Wilson as Tommy
Adrianne Joseph as Louise, Rod's girlfriend
Jim Moss as Mad
Nick Nicholson as Rod
 James Sampson as The Voodoo Priest (uncredited)
Fausto Lombardi as Head Scientist (uncredited)
Alberto Dell'Acqua as Scientist who shoots The Voodoo Priest (uncredited)
Ottaviano Dell'Acqua as 3rd Scientist (uncredited) 
Claudio Fragasso as The Narrator (voice) (uncredited) 
Romano Puppo as Zombie Leader 
Luciano Pigozzi (credited as Alan Collins) as Doctor 
Maurizio Cerantola as The Balladeer (voice) (uncredited)

Production
Director Claudio Fragasso's wife, Rosella Drudi did not receive credit for the story for Zombi 3, but is credited as the sole author of the screenplay credit for After Death. The film stars Jeff Stryker, who is better known for his roles in both straight and gay pornography films. The film was his first non-pornography role. The remaining majority of the cast were English-speaking performers, but their voices were dubbed in post-production.

The film was predominantly shot on location in the Philippines, with the earliest scenes in the film shot in studios in Rome. Fragasso stated the film was made under duress during shooting in the Philippines, where he remained awake through the entire two-week shoot of the film. Fragasso referred to After Death as the "last gasp" of the Italian zombie gore film.

Release
After Death passed Italian censorship on 13 April 1989. The film was distributed by Variety Film in Italy. 

It was released in Germany on home video in 1989 in a heavily edited form.
After Death was retitled Zombie 4 by its Japanese video distributors, but the title never appears on any print of the film. It was also released under the title Zombie Flesh Eaters 3.

Reception
In a retrospective review in Video Watchdog, After Death was described as having a "rousing opening sequence" but the story was critiqued for being "superficial and by-the-numbers even by the subgenre standards" and having an "incoherent ending". In his book Horror and Science Fiction Film IV, Donald C Willis described the film as "flat" and "elementary" and commented that it was an imitation of the films of George A. Romero. Glenn Kay commented in the book Zombies: The Ultimate Guide that the film was "so atrocious and nonsensical that one finds it impossible to believe it has any connection to Romero's zombie classic."

Footnotes

References

External links

After Death at Variety Distribution

Films directed by Claudio Fragasso
Italian supernatural horror films
Italian sequel films
1980s Italian-language films
English-language Italian films
Living Dead films
Films shot in the Philippines
Films shot in Rome
1980s Italian films